Stan Laurel (born Arthur Stanley Jefferson; 16 June 1890 – 23 February 1965) was an English comic actor, writer, and film director who was one half of the comedy duo Laurel and Hardy. He appeared with his comedy partner Oliver Hardy in 107 short films, feature films, and cameo roles.

Laurel began his career in music hall, where he developed a number of his standard comic devices, including the bowler hat, the deep comic gravity, and the nonsensical understatement, and developed his skills in pantomime and music hall sketches. He was a member of "Fred Karno's Army", where he was Charlie Chaplin's understudy. He and Chaplin arrived in the United States on the same ship from the United Kingdom with the Karno troupe. Laurel began his film career in 1917 and made his final appearance in 1951. He appeared with his comic partner Oliver Hardy in the film short The Lucky Dog in 1921, although they did not become an official team until late 1927. He then appeared exclusively with Hardy until retiring after his comedy partner's death in 1957.

In April 1961, at the 33rd Academy Awards, Laurel was given an Academy Honorary Award for his pioneering work in comedy, and he has a star on the Hollywood Walk of Fame at 7021 Hollywood Boulevard. Laurel and Hardy were ranked top among best double acts and seventh overall in a 2005 UK poll to find the Comedians' Comedian. In 2019, Laurel topped a list of the greatest British comedians compiled by a panel on the television channel Gold. In 2009, a bronze statue of the duo was unveiled in Laurel's hometown of Ulverston.

Early life

Arthur Stanley Jefferson was born in his grandparents' house on 16 June 1890 in Argyle Street, Ulverston, Lancashire, to Arthur J. Jefferson, an actor and theatre manager from Bishop Auckland, and Margaret (née Metcalfe), an actress from Ulverston. He was one of five children. One of them was Edward, an actor who appeared in four of Stan's shorts.

His parents were very active in the theatre. In his early years, Laurel spent much time living with his maternal grandmother, Sarah Metcalfe in North Shields. He attended school at King James I Grammar School in Bishop Auckland, County Durham, and the King's School in Tynemouth, Northumberland.

He moved with his parents to Glasgow, Scotland, where he completed his education at Rutherglen Academy. His father managed Glasgow's Metropole Theatre, where Laurel first worked. His boyhood hero was Dan Leno, considered one of the greatest English music hall comedians. With a natural affinity for the theatre, Laurel gave his first professional performance on stage at the Panopticon in Glasgow at the age of sixteen, where he polished his skills at pantomime and music hall sketches. It was the music hall from where he drew his standard comic devices, including his bowler hat and nonsensical understatement.

In 1912 Laurel worked together with Ted Desmond on tour in Netherlands and Belgium as a comedy double act known as the Barto Bros. Their act, which involved them dressing as Romans, finished when Laurel was offered a spot in an American touring troupe. After Laurel left England for America the pair maintained a life-long friendship, sending letters and photos that documented Laurel's rise from an unknown British comedy actor in 1913 to one of the biggest names in Hollywood in the 1950s. The correspondence, spanning around 50 years and including photos of them being reunited in the US, was put up for auction by Desmond's grandson, Geoffrey Nolan, in 2018. He joined Fred Karno's troupe of actors in 1910 with the stage name of "Stan Jefferson"; the troupe also included a young Charlie Chaplin. The music hall nurtured him, and he acted as Chaplin's understudy for some time. Karno was a pioneer of slapstick, and in his biography Laurel stated, "Fred Karno didn't teach Charlie [Chaplin] and me all we know about comedy. He just taught us most of it". Chaplin and Laurel arrived in the United States on the same ship from Britain with the Karno troupe and toured the country. During the First World War, Laurel registered for military service in America on 5 June 1917, as required under the Selective Service Act. He was not called up; his registration card states his status as resident alien and his deafness as exemptions.

The Karno troupe broke up in the spring of 1914. Stan joined with two other former Karno performers, Edgar Hurley and his wife Ethel (known as "Wren") to form "The Three Comiques". On the advice of booking agent Gordon Bostock, they called themselves "the Keystone Trio". Stan started to do his character as an imitation of Charlie Chaplin, and the Hurleys began to do their parts as silent comedians Chester Conklin and Mabel Normand. They played successfully from February through October 1915, until the Hurleys and Stan parted ways. Between 1916 and 1918, he teamed up with Alice Cooke and Baldwin Cooke, who became his lifelong friends, to form the Stan Jefferson Trio.

Amongst other performers, Laurel worked briefly alongside Oliver Hardy in the silent film short The Lucky Dog (1921), before the two were a team. It was around this time that Laurel met Mae Dahlberg. Around the same time, he adopted the stage name of Laurel at Dahlberg's suggestion that his stage name Stan Jefferson was unlucky, due to it having thirteen letters. The pair were performing together when Laurel was offered $75 a week to star in two-reel comedies. After making his first film Nuts in May, Universal offered him a contract. The contract was soon cancelled during a reorganisation at the studio. Among the films in which Dahlberg and Laurel appeared together was the 1922 parody Mud and Sand.

By 1924, Laurel had given up the stage for full-time film work, under contract with Joe Rock for 12 two-reel comedies. The contract had one unusual stipulation: that Dahlberg was not to appear in any of the films. Rock thought that her temperament was hindering Laurel's career. In 1925, she started interfering with Laurel's work, so Rock offered her a cash settlement and a one-way ticket back to her native Australia, which she accepted. The 12 two-reel comedies were Mandarin Mix-Up (1924), Detained (1924), Monsieur Don't Care (1924), West of Hot Dog (1924), Somewhere in Wrong (1925), Twins (1925), Pie-Eyed (1925), The Snow Hawk (1925), Navy Blue Days (1925), The Sleuth (1925), Dr. Pyckle and Mr. Pryde (1925) and Half a Man (1925). Laurel was credited for directing or co-directing ten silent shorts (between 1925 and 1927), but appeared in none of these. Laurel's future partner Hardy, however, did appear in three of the shorts directed by Laurel: Yes, Yes, Nanette! (1925), Wandering Papas (1926) and Madame Mystery (1926).

Laurel and Hardy

Laurel next signed with the Hal Roach studio, where he began directing films, including a 1926 production called Yes, Yes, Nanette (in which Oliver Hardy had a part under the name "Babe" Hardy). It had been his intention to work primarily as a writer and director.

The same year, Hardy, a member of the Hal Roach Studios Comedy All Star players, was injured in a kitchen mishap and hospitalised. Because he was unable to work on the scheduled film, Get 'Em Young, Laurel was asked to return to acting to fill in. Starting early in 1927, Laurel and Hardy began sharing the screen in several short films, including Duck Soup, Slipping Wives and With Love and Hisses. The two became friends and their comic chemistry soon became obvious. Roach Studios' supervising director Leo McCarey noticed the audience reaction to them and began teaming them, leading to the creation of the Laurel and Hardy series later that year.

Together, the two men began producing a huge body of short films, including The Battle of the Century, Should Married Men Go Home?, Two Tars, Be Big!, Big Business, and many others. Laurel and Hardy successfully made the transition to talking films with the short Unaccustomed As We Are in 1929. They also appeared in their first feature in one of the revue sequences of The Hollywood Revue of 1929, and the following year they appeared as the comic relief in the lavish all-colour (in Technicolor) musical feature The Rogue Song. Their first starring feature Pardon Us was released in 1931. They continued to make both features and shorts until 1935, including their 1932 three-reeler The Music Box, which won an Academy Award for Best Short Subject.

Trouble at Roach Studio
During the 1930s, Laurel was involved in a dispute with Hal Roach which resulted in the termination of his contract. Roach maintained separate contracts for Laurel and Hardy that expired at different times, so Hardy remained at the studio and was "teamed" with Harry Langdon for the 1939 film Zenobia. The studio discussed a series of films co-starring Hardy with Patsy Kelly to be called "The Hardy Family". But Laurel sued Roach over the contract dispute. Eventually, the case was dropped and Laurel returned to Roach. The first film that Laurel and Hardy made after Laurel returned was A Chump at Oxford. Subsequently, they made Saps at Sea, which was their last film for Roach.

Second World War

In 1941, Laurel and Hardy signed a contract at 20th Century-Fox to make ten films over five years. Laurel found, to his shock, that he and Hardy were hired only as actors, and were not expected to contribute to the staging, writing, or editing of the productions. When the films proved very successful, Laurel and Hardy were granted more freedom and gradually added more of their own material. They had made six Fox features when the studio suddenly abandoned B-picture production in December 1944. The team signed another contract with Metro-Goldwyn-Mayer in 1942, resulting in two more features.

Revisiting his music hall days, Laurel returned to England in 1947 when he and Hardy went on a six-week tour of the United Kingdom performing in variety shows. Mobbed wherever they went, Laurel's homecoming to Ulverston took place in May, and the duo were greeted by thousands of fans outside the Coronation Hall. The Evening Mail noted: "Oliver Hardy remarked to our reporter that Stan had talked about Ulverston for the past 22 years and he thought he had to see it." The tour included a Royal Variety Performance in front of King George VI and his consort Queen Elizabeth in London. The success of the tour led them to spend the next seven years touring the UK and Europe.

Around this time, Laurel found out that he had diabetes, so he encouraged Hardy to find solo projects, which he did, taking parts in John Wayne and Bing Crosby films.

In 1950, Laurel and Hardy were invited to France to make a feature film. The film was a disaster, a Franco-Italian co-production titled Atoll K. (The film was entitled Utopia in the US and Robinson Crusoeland in the UK.) Both stars were noticeably ill during the filming. Upon returning to the United States, they spent most of their time recovering. In 1952, Laurel and Hardy toured Europe successfully, and they returned in 1953 for another tour of the continent. During this tour, Laurel fell ill and was unable to perform for several weeks.

In May 1954, Hardy had a heart attack and cancelled the tour. In 1955, they were planning to do a television series called Laurel and Hardy's Fabulous Fables based on children's stories. The plans were delayed after Laurel suffered a stroke on 25 April 1955, from which he recovered. But as the team was planning to get back to work, Hardy had a major stroke on 14 September 1956 and was unable to return to acting.

Hardy's death
Oliver Hardy died on 7 August 1957. Those who knew Laurel reported he was absolutely devastated by Hardy's death and never fully recovered from it; his wife told the press that he became physically ill upon hearing that Hardy was dying. Laurel was in fact too ill to attend his funeral and said, "Babe would understand". Although he continued to socialize with his fans, he refused to perform on stage or act in another film from then on as he had no interest in working without Hardy, turning down every offer he was given for a public appearance.

After Laurel and Hardy
In 1961, Stan Laurel was given an Academy Honorary Award "for his creative pioneering in the field of cinema comedy". Laurel was introduced by Bob Hope, and the award was accepted by Danny Kaye. Laurel had achieved his lifelong dream as a comedian and had been involved in nearly 190 films. He lived his final years in a small flat in the Oceana Apartments in Santa Monica, California. Laurel was gracious to fans and spent much time answering fan mail. His phone number was also listed in the telephone directory and he would take calls from fans.

Jerry Lewis was among the comedians to visit Laurel, and Lewis received suggestions from him for the production of The Bellboy (1960). Lewis paid tribute to Laurel by naming his main character Stanley in the film, and having Bill Richmond play a version of Laurel as well. Dick Van Dyke told a similar story. When he was just starting his career, he looked up Laurel's phone number, called him, and then visited him at his home. Van Dyke played Laurel on "The Sam Pomerantz Scandals" episode of The Dick Van Dyke Show. Laurel was offered a cameo role in It's a Mad, Mad, Mad, Mad World (1963), but declined. He reportedly said he
did not want to be on screen in his old age, especially without Hardy. It appears, however, his involvement reached the stage of filming a background matching shot of his old time convertible, with a stand-in seated, at the wheel, donning a derby hat. The cameo appearance was then given to Jack Benny, who wore Laurel's signature derby in the scene.

Personal life

Laurel and Mae Dahlberg never married but lived together as common-law husband and wife from 1919 to 1925, before Dahlberg accepted a one-way ticket from Joe Rock to go back to her native Australia. In November 1937, Dahlberg was back in the US and sued Laurel for financial support. At the time, Laurel's second marriage was in the process of a divorce, with Dahlberg's legal suit adding to Laurel's woes. The matter was settled out of court. Dahlberg was described as a "relief project worker" by the court. Laurel was one of several popular British actors in Hollywood who never became a naturalised US citizen.

Laurel had four wives and married one of them a second time after their divorce. His first wife was Lois Neilson, whom he married on 13 August 1926. Their second child, Stanley, was born two months premature in May 1930, but died after nine days. Laurel and Neilson divorced in December 1934. Their daughter Lois died on  aged 89.
 
In 1935, Laurel married Virginia Ruth Rogers (known as Ruth). In 1937, he filed for divorce, confessing that he was not over his ex-wife Lois, but Lois decided against a reconciliation.

On New Year's Day 1938, Laurel married Vera Ivanova Shuvalova (known as Illeana), and Ruth accused him of bigamy, but their divorce had been finalised a couple of days before his new marriage. The new marriage was very volatile, and Illeana accused him of trying to bury her alive in the back yard of their San Fernando Valley home. He and Illeana separated in 1939 and divorced in 1940, with Illeana surrendering all claim to the Laurel surname on 1 February 1940 in exchange for $6,500.

In 1941, Laurel remarried Virginia Ruth Rogers; they were divorced for the second time in early 1946. On 6 May 1946, he married Ida Kitaeva Raphael to whom he remained married until his death.

Death

Laurel was a smoker until suddenly quitting around 1960. In January 1965, he underwent a series of x-rays for an infection on the roof of his mouth. He died on 23 February 1965, aged 74, four days after suffering a heart attack. Minutes before his death, he told his nurse that he would not mind going skiing, and she replied that she was not aware that he was a skier. "I'm not," said Laurel, "I'd rather be doing that than getting all these needles stuck in me!" A few minutes later he died quietly in his armchair.

At his funeral service at Church of the Hills, Buster Keaton said, "Chaplin wasn't the funniest. I wasn't the funniest; this man was the funniest." Dick Van Dyke gave the eulogy as a friend, protégé, and occasional impressionist of Laurel during his later years; he read The Clown's Prayer. Laurel had quipped, "If anyone at my funeral has a long face, I'll never speak to him again." He was interred in Forest Lawn–Hollywood Hills Cemetery.

Legacy and honours

Laurel and Hardy are featured on the cover of the Beatles' 1967 album Sgt. Pepper's Lonely Hearts Club Band. In 1989, a statue of Laurel was erected in Dockwray Square, North Shields, Tyne and Wear, England, where he lived at No. 8 from 1897 to 1902. The steps down from the Square to the North Shields Fish Quay were said to have inspired the piano-moving scene in The Music Box. In a 2005 UK poll, Comedians' Comedian, Laurel and Hardy were ranked top double act, and seventh overall. Along with Hardy, Laurel was inducted into the Grand Order of Water Rats.

Neil Brand wrote a radio play entitled Stan, broadcast in 2004 on BBC Radio 4 and subsequently on BBC Radio 4 Extra, starring Tom Courtenay as Stan Laurel, in which Stan visits Oliver Hardy after Hardy has suffered his stroke and tries to say the things to his dying friend and partner that have been left unsaid. In 2006, BBC Four showed a drama called Stan, based on Brand's radio play, in which Laurel meets Hardy on his deathbed and reminisces about their career.

A plaque on the Bull Inn, Bottesford, Leicestershire, England, marks Laurel and Hardy appearing in Nottingham over Christmas 1952, and staying with Laurel's sister, Olga, who was the landlady of the pub. In 2008, a statue of Stan Laurel was unveiled in Bishop Auckland, County Durham, on the site of the Eden Theatre. In April 2009, a bronze statue of Laurel and Hardy was unveiled in Ulverston.

There is a Laurel and Hardy Museum in Stan's hometown of Ulverston. There are two Laurel and Hardy museums in Hardy's hometown of Harlem, Georgia. One is operated by the town of Harlem, and the other is a private museum owned and operated by Gary Russeth, a Harlem resident. Jefferson Drive in Ulverston is named after him.

In 2013 Gail Louw and Jeffrey Holland debuted a short one-man play "...And this is my friend Mr Laurel" at the Camden Fringe festival. The play, starring Holland as Laurel, was taken on tour of the UK in 2014 until June 2015.

In the 2018 film Stan & Ollie, Steve Coogan portrayed Laurel (a performance which saw him nominated for the BAFTA for Best Actor in a Leading Role) and John C. Reilly played Hardy. Developed by BBC Films, the film is set in the twilight of their careers, and focuses on their farewell tour of Britain and Ireland's variety halls in 1953.

In 2019 Laurel was voted the greatest ever British comedian by a panel on the British television channel Gold.

Filmography
 Stan Laurel filmography (films of Stan Laurel as an actor without Oliver Hardy)
 Laurel and Hardy filmography (filmography of Laurel and Hardy together)

References

Notes

Citations

Bibliography

 Bergen, Ronald. The Life and Times of Laurel and Hardy. New York: Smithmark, 1992. .
 Bowers, Judith. Stan Laurel and Other Stars of the Panopticon: The Story of the Britannia Music Hall. Edinburgh: Birlinn Ltd, 2007. .
 Louvish, Simon. Stan and Ollie: The Roots of Comedy. London: Faber & Faber, 2001. .
 Marriot, A. J. Laurel & Hardy: The British Tours. Hitchen, Herts, UK: AJ Marriot, 1993. .
 Levy, Joe, ed. Rolling Stone's 500 Greatest Albums of All Time. New York: Wenner Books, 2005. .
 McCabe, John. Babe: The Life of Oliver Hardy. London: Robson Books Ltd., 2004. .
 McCabe, John. Comedy World of Stan Laurel. London: Robson Books, 2005, First edition 1975. .
 McCabe, John. Mr. Laurel & Mr. Hardy: An Affectionate Biography. London: Robson Books, 2004, First edition 1961, .
 Stone, Rob. Laurel or Hardy: The Solo Films of Stan Laurel and Oliver Hardy. Temecula, California: Split Reel Books, 1996
 Okuda, Ted, and James L. Neibaur. Stan Without Ollie: The Stan Laurel Solo Films. Jefferson, NC: McFarland and Co., 2012
 Guiles, Fred Lawrence. Stan: The Life of Stan Laurel. New York: Stein and Day., 1980

External links

 
 
 
 The Making of Stan Laurel: Echoes of a British Boyhood article at Brenton Film by Danny Lawrence, Stan Laurel's biographer
 The Stan Laurel Correspondence Archive Project

English male comedians

Comedians from Lancashire
British male comedy actors
English entertainers
English male film actors
English male silent film actors
English male stage actors
English stunt performers
Music hall performers
Silent film comedians
Vaudeville performers
1890 births
1965 deaths
Academy Honorary Award recipients
Screen Actors Guild Life Achievement Award
20th Century Studios contract players
Hal Roach Studios actors
Metro-Goldwyn-Mayer contract players
English emigrants to the United States
British expatriate male actors in the United States
People educated at The King's School, Tynemouth
People educated at Stonelaw High School
People from Ulverston
Burials at Forest Lawn Memorial Park (Hollywood Hills)
Articles containing video clips
19th-century English people
20th-century English male actors
20th-century English comedians
Hal Roach Studios short film series
People educated at Queen's Park Secondary School